Cortisone acetate (brand names Adreson, Cortison, Cortisone, Cortisone Acetate, Cortone, Cortistab, Cortisyl, others) is a synthetic glucocorticoid corticosteroid and corticosteroid ester which is marketed (under prescription) in many countries throughout the world, including in the United States, the United Kingdom, and various other European countries. It is the C21 acetate ester of cortisone, and acts as a prodrug of cortisone in the body.

References

Acetate esters
Tertiary alcohols
Corticosteroid esters
Glucocorticoids
Mineralocorticoids
Polyketones
Pregnanes
Prodrugs